Luigi Branciforte (died 1665) was a Roman Catholic prelate who served as Bishop of Melfi e Rapolla (1648–1665).

Biography
Luigi Branciforte was born in Palermo, Italy.
On 28 Sep 1648, he was appointed during the papacy of Pope Innocent X as Bishop of Melfi e Rapolla.
On 18 Oct 1648, he was consecrated bishop by Pier Luigi Carafa (seniore), Cardinal-Priest of Santi Silvestro e Martino ai Monti. 
He served as Bishop of Melfi e Rapolla until his death in 1665.

References

External links and additional sources
 (for Chronology of Bishops) 
 (for Chronology of Bishops) 

17th-century Italian Roman Catholic bishops
Bishops appointed by Pope Innocent X
1665 deaths